Darwan Lake is located near Hathpakad and Katehri.

References

Lakes of Uttar Pradesh
Ambedkar Nagar district